John Shea Crawford (October 26, 1916 – January 19, 1973) was a Canadian ice hockey defenceman and coach. He was born in Dublin, Ontario. Despite Crawford's preference to be called "Johnny" or "John", the media often referred to him as "Jack".

Crawford started his National Hockey League career with the Boston Bruins in 1938. He played his entire career with the Bruins and retired after the 1950 season. In 1943 and 1946, he was a member of the NHL All-Star team. He won two Stanley Cups with Boston 1939, 1941.

Crawford coached 659 games in the American Hockey League (10th on the all-time list) with the Hershey Bears (1950–52), Providence Reds (1955–60), Rochester Americans (1961–62), and Baltimore Clippers (1964-66). He was the general manager of the Cape Cod Cubs of the Eastern Hockey League when he collapsed on January 17, 1973, while attending his team's home game. He died at the Cape Cod Hospital on January 19, 1973. He was 56 years old.

Career statistics

See also
list of NHL players who spent their entire career with one franchise

References

External links

1916 births
1973 deaths
Boston Bruins captains
Boston Bruins players
Boston Bruins announcers
Canadian ice hockey defencemen
Ice hockey people from Ontario
People from Perth County, Ontario
Stanley Cup champions
Canadian expatriate ice hockey players in the United States
Canadian emigrants to the United States